Ovrya is a town in Achaea, Greece. It is a suburb of Patras, located 6 km south of Patras city centre. It was the seat of the former municipality of Messatida. The Greek National Roads 9 (Patras - Pyrgos) and 33 (Patras - Tripoli) pass through the town. Ovrya is in the transition zone from the densely populated coastal area to the hills in the southeast, including Omplos. Agriculture (olive groves, pastures) is still the dominant land use in the areas south and east of  Ovrya. Neighboring communities are Demenika to the northeast, Mintilogli to the west, Krini to the east, and Kallithea to the south.

Gallery

References

External links

GTP - Ovrya

Populated places in Achaea
Patras